The Pakistan Premier League (PPL) is a Pakistani professional league for men's association football clubs. At the top of the Pakistan football league system, it is the country's primary football competition. Contested by 16 clubs, it operates on a system of promotion and relegation with the Football Federation League.

Since inception of the Pakistan Premier League in 2004, four clubs have won the title: Khan Research Laboratories (5) WAPDA (4), Pakistan Army (2) and K-Electric (1). The current champions are Khan Research Laboratories, who won the title in 2018–19.

History

Pakistan's first professional football league began on 28 May 1948 as the "National Football Championship". The league was a knock-out competition, which remained as the top football league in the country until 2004 with the introduction of the Pakistan Premier League. National Football Championship featured teams representing cities or provinces, unlike current format where departmental teams play, with exception of Balochistan clubs (including Afghan Chaman, Baloch Nushki, Baloch Quetta and Muslim which represents the city of Chaman, Nushki and Quetta respectively, National Football League also featured teams from Dhaka (Dacca FC) and Chittagong (Chittagong FC) from East Pakistan (now Bangladesh). Dacca FC won two back-to-back leagues, and Chittagong FC won league only once.

National League
In August 2003, major restructuring was undertaken by the Pakistan Football Federation with support of FIFA's Goal Programme. Several new training facilities were built across the country and a new Pakistan Football Federation Head Office was built in Lahore. Under new management, the Pakistan Football Federation restructured the National Football Championship and in 2004 introduced the National League Division A Football League (which contained 12 clubs across Pakistan) and the National League Division B Football League (containing 5 clubs).

Premier League
In 2006–07 season, the National League Division A Football League was renamed to the Pakistan Premier League while the National League Division B Football League was renamed to the PFF League. In the following 2007–08 season, the league was expanded to 14 clubs. For the 2010–11 season the league was expanded to 16 clubs. The two bottom teams at the end of each Pakistan Premier League season would to be relegated to the PFF League, while the top 2 teams in the Football Federation League would be promoted to the Pakistan Premier League.

"Punjab Three" Dominance

Since the beginning of Pakistan Premier League, Punjab clubs has been dominating with  Khan Research Laboratories, Pakistan Army (from Rawalpindi) and WAPDA (from Lahore) winning league for combined ten times in the span of eleven years, with Khan Research Laboratories and WAPDA winning four times each and Pakistan Army winning two time The "Punjab Three" also dominated the domestic cup, where Khan Research Laboratories won the cup six times (with four consecutive cup wins in 2009, 2010, 2011 and 2012 editions) and were runners-up in 2008 edition, while other two clubs did not dominate the cup, as only WAPDA being runners-up in 2005 and 2018 edition. Arif Mehmood of WAPDA is currently the top scorer of Pakistan Premier League with 102 goals, winning top scorer awards five times.

Current clubs (2021)

Champions

List of champions by season

Most successful clubs since 2004

Ranking

As of 26 August 2021

Structure
The Pakistan Premier League is directly under control of the Pakistan Football Federation or PFF. The PFF oversees all aspects of the league and makes unilateral decisions over any changes to the format, funding and sponsorship.

Professionalization
The Pakistan Football Federation have announced they will try and professionalize the league by introducing city-based teams and getting rid of "departmental" teams, which, although financially stable, do not have much of a fan following. This has led to a more professional football structure in Pakistan.

Competition format

Competition
There are currently 14 clubs in the PPL. The season lasts during the winter months stretching from November to February, with each club playing the others twice, once at their home stadium and once at that of their opponents for a total of 26 games for each club, with a total of 210 games in each season. Each teams receives three points for a win and one point for a draw. Teams are ranked by total points, then goal difference and then goals scored. At the end of each season, the club with the most points is crowned as PPL Champion. At the end of the season, the two worst teams are relegated directly to the PFF League, while the top two teams in the PFF League are promoted to the PPL.

Qualification for Asian competitions
The top team in the PPL automatically qualified for the AFC President's Cup until it's abolishment in 2014, it was the weakest branch of Asian Football, but the winner of the PPL would later be nominated for the AFC Cup from 2016. Technically, the PFF can nominate any team to represent them in Asia; however, only the team that finished top of their highest league are sent.

Sponsorship

Players
Pakistan Premier League clubs have almost complete freedom to sign whatever number and category of players they wish. There is no team or individual salary cap, no squad size limit, no age restrictions other than those applied by general employment law. However teams are restricted to not more than 2 foreign players in the squad for the season. Players move on free transfers as contracts only last for a year, but some contracts can be as long as three years, and the transfer fees are small. Due to the nature of the league, players tend to work for the company they play for during the off season and top players can command respectable football salaries. Players that earn a nominal salary need second jobs to support themselves.

Media
PTV Sports was the official media partner of Pakistan Premier League. It showed live matches of the league while Geo Super showed highlights.

Awards

Top Scorer

Most Valuable Player

Goalkeeper of the year

Fair Play Trophy

Criticism
The Pakistan Football Federation has been severely criticized for its non-serious attempts to increase the quality of football in the country. The PFF cites claims of lack of funds from the government, however these claims are largely rejected by players and owners alike who all agree that the PFF is severely mismanaged and corrupt. The league has an "amateurish" setup according to critics, which they claim don't allow players to develop to the level they are capable of. Pakistani clubs are considered lightweight in comparison to other Asian clubs and defeats by the opposition in the AFC President's Cup suggest that this may have some foundation. Another main criticism leveled at the PPL is the number of games played over a short period of time. One team can be forced to play 3 games in a week due to the congested fixture list. The PFF’s attempts to cut costs have led to players becoming exhausted.

Departmental Teams
The lack of independent clubs is also a major issue many football fans in Pakistan are annoyed with. Since the PFF has not made serious attempts to lure large businesses to invest in and/or sponsor teams, the league has a dominance of departmental teams run by the sports division government agencies and private businesses. This has resulted in a serious lack of public interest since nobody is willing to pay money to see departments play. However, critics suggest that if actual city-based teams are promoted with departments acting as sponsors, a fan following may develop. This is clearly evident with Afghan Chaman which has a large fan following and can see up-to 12,000 people attending matches.

See also
Pakistan Premier League Golden Boot
Pakistan Hockey League
Super Kabaddi League

References

External links
RSSSF.com - Pakistan - List of Champions

 
Football leagues in Pakistan
Football competitions in Pakistan
Professional sports leagues in Pakistan
2004 establishments in Pakistan
Top level football leagues in Asia
National association football cups